Playboy TV (originally The Playboy Channel) is a pay television channel based in the United States.

History
The channel first launched on December 9, 1980, as Escapade by Rainbow Programing Services (a joint-venture of four cable companies, led by Cablevision). At launch, Escapade aired mostly R rated B movies. The channel aired five nights a week from 9 PM to 4 or 6 AM, Tuesday through Saturday. Sunday and Monday nights were reserved for Rainbow's other new channel Bravo. The satellite time the two networks used was subleased from National Christian Network. By July 1981, the service expanded to seven nights a week.

In August 1981, Playboy Enterprises became half-owner of Escapade and announced a plan to produce original programming that reflected the contents of Playboy magazine beginning in early 1982. On January 21, 1982, the Playboy Channel on Escapade debuted as a four-hour programming block. The first program was an interview with John and Bo Derek, followed by footage of January playmate Shannon Tweed, the West German adult movie Vanessa, and a magazine features including "Ribald Classics". Over the months that followed, Escapade would gradually increase the amount of Playboy programming.

The channel officially relaunched as the Playboy Channel on November 18, 1982.  The original programming and style of the Playboy Channel was developed by Hugh Hefner, and producer Michael Trikilis. Playboy hired its own sales and marketing staff and launched the channel on several major multiple system operators. At the time of its launch, programming featured on the channel consisted of R-rated films. It was broadcast for only ten hours each day, from 8 p.m. to 6 a.m. ET, during its first eleven years of existence. In October 1983, Rainbow Media exited the partnership by selling its share to Playboy, but would continue to distribute the channel until 1986. The channel re-launched as Playboy TV and adopted its current name on November 1, 1989. The network expanded its programming with the adoption of a 24-hour schedule in 1994.

In 2008, the channel launched its HD simulcast feed under the name "Playboy TV HD".

In November 2011, Playboy Enterprises sold its ownership of its media properties (including the Spice Networks) to Manwin (later MindGeek), who would operate them, including Playboy TV, under the "Playboy Plus Entertainment" subsidiary. Although Playboy Enterprises would re-acquire their website, MindGeek still continues operate Playboy TV under license.

Programming
Playboy TV was originally developed as a video version of Playboy Magazine. Programming featured music reviews, celebrity interviews, men's fashion and segments on cars. It was a video extension of the magazine - an established lifestyle brand. Slowly the programming on the channel evolved to feature more attractive women and eventually soft core features. This then evolved to what would become more standard television programming with a focus primarily on a male demographic.

In 2010, Playboy TV unveiled a new program slate, which featured series tailored to both male and female viewers.

Programs on Playboy TV

69 Sexy Things 2 Do B4 U Die
Around the World in 80 Babes
Brooklyn Kinda Love
Canoga Park
Cougar Club
Dark Justice
The Tryst List
Early Bird Yoga
E-Rotic
Electric Blue
FrolicMe Passion
FrolicMe Stories
Hot Babes Doing Stuff Naked
Intimate Tales
Jazmin's Touch
Jenna's American Sex Star
King of Clubs
Money Talks
Naughty Amateur Home Videos
Night Calls
Playboy Centerfolds
Playboy Muses
Playboy Shootout
Playmates!
Sam's Game
School Of Sex
Search for the Perfect Girlfriend
Secret Sessions
Seduction Principles
Seven Motives
Sex Court
Sexcetera
Suite Rendezvous
Sexcape
Show Us Your Wits
Swing
The Life Erotic
The Tryst List
Totally Busted
Triple Play
Undercover
World of Playboy

References

External links
 

American pornographic television channels
American pornographic film studios
Television networks in the United States
Commercial-free television networks
Playboy
Television channels and stations established in 1982
Men's interest channels
Nudity in television
Television pornography
18+